Ossi Kanervo (born 23 November 1987) is a Finnish ice dancer. With partner Henna Lindholm, he is the 2012 Nordic champion, the 2014 Bavarian Open bronze medalist, and a three-time Finnish national champion.

Kanervo trained only in single skating until the age of 16-17, when he began learning ice dancing once a week under Susanna Rahkamo. Following a partnership with Janna Hujanen, he teamed up with Henna Lindholm around 2008. He also continued to compete in single skating until the spring of 2009. Lindholm/Kanervo qualified for the free dance at the 2014 European Championships and finished 20th. They retired from competitive skating on May 13, 2015.

Programs 
(with Lindholm)

Competitive highlights 
CS: Challenger Series (began in the 2014–15 season)

With Lindholm

With Hujanen

References

External links 

 
 Henna Lindholm / Ossi Kanervo at sport-folio.net
 Henna Lindholm / Ossi Kanervo at Tracings

1987 births
Finnish male ice dancers
Living people
Sportspeople from Oulu